2008 J.League Cup Final was the 16th final of the J.League Cup competition. The final was played at National Stadium in Tokyo on November 1, 2008. Oita Trinita won the championship.

Match details

See also
2008 J.League Cup

References

J.League Cup
2008 in Japanese football
Oita Trinita matches
Shimizu S-Pulse matches